"Homecoming" is the sixth episode of the third season of the HBO original series The Wire. The episode was written by Rafael Alvarez from a story by David Simon & Rafael Alvarez and was directed by Leslie Libman. It originally aired on October 31, 2004.

Plot
After a political event, Daniels' wife Marla raises the possibility of reconciling. However, Daniels explains that he cannot promise any more than his continued support of her career, later telling Pearlman that he feels he still owes her to fill the role of a supportive spouse. During a game of racquetball, Carcetti and Gray skirt around the issue of who should run against Mayor Royce, with Carcetti seemingly conceding that only a black person could win the race. Carcetti again asks D'Agostino to run his campaign, saying that Baltimore's black vote will be split if Royce and Gray both run. Royce and Parker suggest to Burrell that he may not keep his job as police commissioner if the city's crime rate keeps rising.

In Homicide, Bunk tells Landsman that he will work on the double homicide of Tosha and Tank rather than wasting time on the missing gun; Landsman finally agrees. Bunk interviews Tosha's family and asks them to have Omar contact him. The word gets back to Omar, who catches up with the witness who identified him to Bunk and convinces him to change his story. Omar arranges a meeting with Bunk, telling him there is no victim in the case of the shooting. Bunk, enraged, talks about their shared past at Edmondson High School and says that the empathy and sense of community in their neighborhoods is all but gone. In the Western, Colvin has Carver and his other men forcibly relocate any straggling dealers into Hamsterdam.

Despite the positive effect Hamsterdam has on the wider neighborhood, Colvin notices one resident remaining in the zone. When the resident refuses to move, Colvin approaches Foerster with the necessary paperwork, telling him the woman is a witness in a drug case. Colvin again finds himself relying on information from the Major Case Unit, and requests their assistance in targeting both the Barksdales and the Stanfields. Meanwhile, Bell and Avon are dismayed to find costs spiraling at their development site. They join Slim Charles in surveying territory. Avon questions why the Barksdales are conceding their best territory to Marlo without a fight and resolves to get his corners back. Bell and Bodie agree to move a small part of their business to Hamsterdam to test the waters. Avon orders Slim Charles to attack Marlo using Cutty and other muscle.

Bell is told that construction at the site is being held up by city hall. When he meets with Davis, the senator demands $25,000 to move things ahead. Cutty and Slim Charles devise a plan of attack and explain it to their crew. However, the plan goes awry when the getaway driver, Chipper, makes his move too early and allows himself and Country to get killed by Marlo's crew. Cutty, Slim Charles, and Gerard manage to escape. When Avon and Bell disagree on their next move, Slim Charles and Cutty volunteer to handle things themselves. Marlo's advisor Vinson warns him to expect retribution from Avon. Marlo readies his soldiers Snoop and Partlow for the coming gang war. Brianna gives her blessing for Donette to pursue her relationship with Bell, but is startled by McNulty's allegation that D'Angelo's death was not a suicide.

Cutty and Slim Charles come across Fruit's crew with their guard down. Cutty has a shot lined up on Fruit, but allows him to escape. When Avon expresses his disappointment, Cutty admits that he couldn't shoot Fruit because "the game" is no longer part of him and that he wants no further involvement. Avon, still respectful of Cutty, lets him go on good terms. Meanwhile, McNulty and Greggs mistakenly report to Daniels that Marlo is a new member of the Barksdales, erroneously concluding that Marlo's territory belongs to Bell. Despite the detectives' urging, Daniels rules that as long as Bell isn't openly violent, they have no call to investigate him. McNulty and Greggs meet with a state's attorney in Anne Arundel County to discuss reopening D'Angelo's case, but are told that another murder will not be put on the county's books without a suspect. The two go drinking and discuss their relationship difficulties.

Bubbles tells Greggs about the botched gunfight and corrects her about the relationship between the Stanfield and Barksdale crews. She and McNulty report the new killings to Daniels, who chastises them for insubordination. Acting on a plan with Greggs, McNulty presents the case to Colvin, who sees that he is going behind Daniels' back. The next day, Colvin, Rawls and Burrell meet with Daniels to give him his new assignment.

Production

Title reference
The title refers to the return of Avon Barksdale and also the major case unit returning its focus to investigating the Barksdale organization. Additionally, the title may refer to Cutty's desire to leave the game, but his lack of experience or skills to do so.

Epigraph

Avon makes this statement to Stringer in reference to his own inability to adjust to the new legitimate aspects of their business, and an inability to escape the molds of the institution.

References to other media
Omar is shown watching a scene from the Oz episode "Sonata de Oz".

Carcetti's wife, Jen, and his two children are listening to "Hoodoo Voodoo" from Billy Bragg & Wilco's album Mermaid Avenue when Carcetti returns home one evening.

Credits

Starring cast
Although credited, Clarke Peters, Jim True-Frost, and Corey Parker Robinson do not appear in this episode.

Guest stars
Glynn Turman as Mayor Clarence Royce
Isiah Whitlock, Jr. as Senator Clayton "Clay" Davis
Chad L. Coleman as Dennis "Cutty" Wise
Jamie Hector as Marlo Stanfield
Maria Broom as Marla Daniels
Michael Hyatt as Brianna Barksdale
Delaney Williams as Sergeant Jay Landsman
Brandy Burre as Theresa D'Agostino
Benjamin Busch as Officer Anthony Colicchio
Jay Landsman as Lieutenant Dennis Mello
Megan Anderson as Jen Carcetti
Shamyl Brown as Donette
Verna Lee Day as Mrs. Hazel
Anwan Glover as Slim Charles
Kelli R. Brown as Kimmy
Nina Hodoruk as State's Attorney Kendall Remnick
Richard DeAngelis as Colonel Raymond Foerster
Michael Salconi as Officer Michael Santangelo
Ernest Waddell as Dante
Mayo Best as Gerard
Richard Burton as Sean "Shamrock" McGinty
Norris Davis as Vinson
Brandon Fobbs as Fruit
Addison Switzer as Country
Gbenga Akinnagbe as Chris Partlow
Christopher Mann as Councilman Tony Gray
Cleo Reginald Pizana as Chief of Staff Coleman Parker
Frederick Strother as State Delegate Odell Watkins
Michael Willis as Andy Krawczyk

Uncredited appearances
R. Emery Bright as Community Relations Sergeant
Edward Green as Spider
Felicia Pearson as Snoop
Ryan Sands as Officer Lloyd "Truck" Garrick
Esley Tate as Boo
Unknown as Chipper
Unknown as Bruiser

First appearances
Snoop: Young female enforcer in the Stanfield organization.

References

External links
"Homecoming" at HBO.com

The Wire (season 3) episodes
2004 American television episodes